Sonja Steinacher (born August 16, 1975 in Brixen) is a luger from Verdings/Klausen in South Tyrol who has competed for Italy since 1995. A natural track luger, she won five medals at the FIL World Luge Natural Track Championships with four medals in women's singles (Gold: 2001, 2003; Silver: 2000, Bronze: 1998) and a gold in the mixed team event (2003).

Steinacher also won three medals in the women's singles event at the FIL European Luge Natural Track Championships with one gold (1999 and two bronzes (1997, 2002).

References
FIL-Luge profile
Natural track European Championships results 1970-2006.
Natural track World Championships results: 1979-2007

External links
 

1975 births
Living people
Italian lugers
Italian female lugers
People from Klausen, South Tyrol
Sportspeople from Südtirol